Trichophysetis flavimargo is a moth in the family Crambidae. It is found in South Africa.

References

Endemic moths of South Africa
Cybalomiinae
Moths described in 1897
Moths of Africa